Brodiaea jolonensis, known by the common name chaparral brodiaea, is a species of flowering plant in the cluster-lily family.

The bulb is native to the coast and coastal mountain ranges of the southern half of California and of northern Baja California. Locations include the southern California Coast Ranges, the Transverse Ranges, the Peninsular Ranges, and the Channel Islands of California.

Description
Brodiaea jolonensis is a perennial producing an inflorescence up to about 15 centimeters tall bearing blue-purple flowers on pedicels a few centimeters long. Each flower has six curving tepals between 1 and 2 centimeters in length. The center of the flower contains three fertile stamens ringed with three prominent sterile stamens called staminodes.

References

External links
Jepson Manual Treatment — Brodiaea jolonensis
USDA Plants Profile: Brodiaea jolonensis (chaparral brodiaea)
Flora of North America
Brodiaea jolonensis — U.C. Photo gallery

jolonensis
Flora of California
Flora of Baja California
Natural history of the California chaparral and woodlands
Natural history of the California Coast Ranges
Natural history of the Channel Islands of California
Natural history of the Peninsular Ranges
Natural history of the Santa Monica Mountains
Natural history of the Transverse Ranges